Neoheterophrictus crurofulvus is a species of tarantula. It is also the type species of Neoheterophrictus and is found in the Western Ghats, India.

Etymology 
The specific name crurofulvus is a mixture of two Latin words: cruro meaning "leg" or "appendage"; and fulvus meaning "tawny" or "yellowish-brown". This refers to the light brown colour of the legs of the female, which is not seen in any other Indian Theraphosid.

Distinguishing features 
Neoheterophrictus crurofulvus is known from the male and female. The female is distinguished by the structure of the spermathecae; there are two receptacles, which narrow at the apex; also upon the apex are a multitude of tiny lobes.

The male differs from other species by having a tibial spur which narrows down towards the apex where there is a pointed spine; it also lacks a basal spine in the retrolateral view of the spur; and the retrolateral two-thirds of the metatarsi and the whole tarsi are coloured white or cream.

References 

Theraphosidae
Spiders described in 2012
Spiders of the Indian subcontinent